Beebea is a genus of moths of the family Crambidae. It contains only one species, Beebea guglielmi, which is found on the Galapagos Islands.

References

Spilomelinae
Crambidae genera
Taxa named by William Schaus